Syed Hussain Shah (born August 14, 1964) is a retired Pakistani boxer from Lyari, Karachi Pakistan, who won the bronze medal in the Middleweight division (71–75 kg) at the 1988 Summer Olympics in Seoul, South Korea. This was the country's first ever Olympic boxing medal. He remains the only Pakistani sportsperson to win an individual medal at the Olympic Games in the last fifty-plus years. Only other Pakistani to ever win an individual Olympic medal is the wrestler Muhammad Bashir, who won a bronze medal at the 1960 Summer Olympics.

Early life
Shah was born in Lyari, Karachi. As a child Shah used to live on streets due to being homeless, he used to work as labor to earn money. Shah trained himself for boxing on streets using garbage bags as a replacement for punching bag.

Career
Shah won his first gold medal at 1984 South Asian Games in Dhaka, along with Asghar Ali, Ilyas Ahmed and Muhammad Yousaf. At the 1987 edition of the Games in Kolkata, he was adjudged the 'best boxer'.

At the 1988 Olympics he shared the podium with Kenya's Chris Sande. He was Pakistan's first boxer to win any medal in olympic boxing. In 1989, Lyari born boxer received Sitara-i-Imtiaz medal from Government of Pakistan.

Shah, who has also to his credit five gold in the South Asian Games history, remained the best boxer of Asia from 1980 to 1988, a rare prominence achieved by any Pakistani pugilist so far.

He later moved to Japan, where his son Shah Hussain Shah learned judo and went on to represent Pakistan at the international level.

Popular Culture

A biopic called Shah was released in Pakistan on 14 August 2015. The film chronicles Hussain Shah's poverty stricken childhood, his rise to fame as the Asian Boxing Champion and Olympic Bronze Medalist, his subsequent return to poverty and finally his migration to Japan to coach Japanese boxers. The movie is directed and written by Adnan Sarwar with music by Adnan Sarwar and Farhan Albert.

Olympic results
1st round bye
Defeated  Martín Amarillas 3-2
Defeated  Serge Kabongo 5-0
Defeated  Zoltán Füzesy 3-2
Lost to  Egerton Marcus 1-4

References

External links
Biography at Pakistan Sports Board 

1964 births
Living people
Boxers at the 1988 Summer Olympics
Olympic boxers of Pakistan
Olympic bronze medalists for Pakistan
Recipients of Sitara-i-Imtiaz
Pakistani expatriates in Japan
Sindhi people
Olympic medalists in boxing
Martial artists from Karachi
Asian Games medalists in boxing
Boxers at the 1986 Asian Games
Pakistani male boxers
Boxers at the 1990 Commonwealth Games
Commonwealth Games competitors for Pakistan
Medalists at the 1988 Summer Olympics
People from Lyari Town
Asian Games silver medalists for Pakistan
Medalists at the 1986 Asian Games
South Asian Games gold medalists for Pakistan
South Asian Games medalists in boxing
Middleweight boxers